Dick Thornton is the name of:
 Dick Thornton (American football) (1908–1973), American football quarterback for the Philadelphia Eagles
 Dick Thornton (Canadian football) (1939–2014), Canadian football wide receiver and defensive back for the Winnipeg Blue Bombers and Toronto Argonauts